Lowys is a surname. Notable people with the surname include:

George Lowys (by 1500–1553/54), English politician
Simon Lowys, MP for Liskeard